Where It's At may refer to:

Music
 Where It's At (Charles Kynard album), 1963
Where It's At, 1966 live album recorded at the Cheetah, New York by Mike St. Shaw and the Prophets
Where It's At, album by The Holmes Brothers 1991
Where It's At (Dustin Lynch album), 2014
"Where It's At" (Beck song), 1996
"Where It's At" (Dustin Lynch song), 2014

Other
Where It's At (film), a Garson Kanin  film 1969 
Where It's At (TV series), Canadian television series presenting musical performances and broadcast during 1968–1969

See also
That's Where It's At, a 1962 jazz record album by Stanley Turrentine
That's Where It's At!, a 1969 album by John Lee Hooker
"That's Where It's At" (song), a 1964 song written & recorded by Sam Cooke